Jefferson County is a county located in the U.S. state of Iowa. As of the 2020 United States Census, the population was 15,663. The county seat is Fairfield. The county was formed in January 1839, and was named for U.S. President Thomas Jefferson.

Jefferson County comprises the Fairfield, IA Micropolitan Statistical Area.

Geography
The Skunk River flows southward through the NE part of the county, while the SW part of the county is drained by the nearby Des Moines River, which flows southeastward through Van Buren and Wapello counties.

Major highways
  U.S. Highway 34
  Iowa Highway 1
  Iowa Highway 78

Transit
 List of intercity bus stops in Iowa

Adjacent counties
 Keokuk County − northwest
 Washington County − northeast
 Henry County − east
 Van Buren County − south
 Wapello County − west

Demographics

2020 census
There were 7,689 housing units, of which 6,902 were occupied.

2010 census
There were 7,594 housing units, of which 6,846 were occupied.

2000 census

As of the 2000 United States Census, there were 16,181 people, 6,649 households, and 4,281 families in the county. There were 7,241 housing units at an average density of 17 per square mile (6/km2). The racial makeup of the county was 96.02% White, 0.64% Black or African American, 0.17% Native American, 1.70% Asian, 0.04% Pacific Islander, 0.53% from other races, and 0.91% from two or more races. 1.84% of the population were Hispanic or Latino of any race.

There were 6,649 households, out of which 31.10% had children under the age of 18 living with them, 53.10% were married couples living together, 8.00% had a female householder with no husband present, and 35.60% were non-families. 30.40% of all households were made up of individuals, and 10.70% had someone living alone who was 65 years of age or older. The average household size was 2.34 and the average family size was 2.93.

The county population contained 24.40% under the age of 18, 7.60% from 18 to 24, 24.40% from 25 to 44, 29.80% from 45 to 64, and 13.80% who were 65 years of age or older. The median age was 41 years. For every 100 females, there were 95.90 males. For every 100 females age 18 and over, there were 93.60 males.

The median income for a household in the county was $33,851, and the median income for a family was $43,819. Males had a median income of $32,066 versus $22,479 for females. The per capita income for the county was $19,579. About 7.40% of families and 10.90% of the population were below the poverty line, including 12.40% of those under age 18 and 9.00% of those age 65 or over.

Law and government

Jefferson County's executive branch is a three-member board of supervisors who are elected to four-year terms. Other elected officials are county auditor, county sheriff, county treasurer, and county recorder.

Politics
Historically, Jefferson County heavily favored presidential candidates from the Republican Party. It is noted for being one of the few counties in Iowa that never voted for Woodrow Wilson, along with having never given a Democrat who carried the county over sixty percent of the vote. In recent decades, politics within the county have become more competitive. From 1992 to 2012, the county has been carried by the Democratic presidential candidate in every election with the exception of 2000, when George W. Bush obtained a plurality. The last Republican to win the county with a majority of the vote was Ronald Reagan in 1984. In the 1996 presidential election, Jefferson County was the only county in the United States to give any (winning) candidate less than forty percent of the vote, with Bill Clinton winning the county 35.1% to Bob Dole's 34.4%. In 2016, Donald Trump received a plurality of the votes in Jefferson County. The county has been the strongest basis of support for the Natural Law Party's presidential campaigns, due to the presence of the Maharishi Vedic City and Maharishi International University. In 2020, the independent presidential candidate Kanye West got his best result in this county.

Communities

Cities

 Batavia
 Coppock (partial)
 Fairfield
 Libertyville
 Lockridge
 Maharishi Vedic City
 Packwood
 Pleasant Plain

Unincorporated communities

 Abingdon
 Beckwith
 East Pleasant Plain
 Germanville
 Glasgow
 Perlee
 Salina

Townships

 Black Hawk
 Buchanan
 Cedar
 Center
 Des Moines
 Liberty
 Lockridge
 Locust Grove
 Penn
 Polk
 Round Prairie
 Walnut

Population ranking
The population ranking of the following table is based on the 2020 census of Jefferson County.

† county seat

See also

National Register of Historic Places listings in Jefferson County, Iowa

Notes

References

External links

County website

 
Iowa counties
1839 establishments in Iowa Territory
Micropolitan areas of Iowa
Populated places established in 1839